Damilola, Our Loved Boy is a British television film about the events surrounding the 27 November 2000 death of Damilola Taylor. The film aired on BBC One on 7 November 2016, and was written by Levi David Addai, directed by Euros Lyn, and starred Babou Ceesay and Wunmi Mosaku. The film received three nominations at the 2017 British Academy Television Awards, winning Best Single Drama and Best Supporting Actress for Mosaku.

Cast
Babou Ceesay as Richard Taylor
Wunmi Mosaku as Gloria Taylor
Juwon Adedokun as Tunde Taylor
Sammy Kamara as Damilola Taylor
Juma Sharkah as Gbemi Taylor
Robert Pugh as DCI Nick Ephgrave
Raphel Famotibe as Dapo
McKell David as Nathan
Shola Adewusi as Auntie Dorcas
Megan Parkinson as Leanne
John Hollingworth as Detective Wallace
Gamba Cole as Junior
 Eugene Wanangwa Khumbanyiwa as Pastor Peter
Alfie Browne-Sykes as Will
Muna Otaru as Tayo
Naomi Ackie as Council Worker
Doc Brown as Cab Driver
Jud Charlton as Prosecution Barrister
Richard Pepple as Defence Barrister
Mario Demetriou as Male Witness
Wanda Opalinska as Pathologist
Imogen Byron as Witness Bromley
Anthony Adjekum as Chris
Ian Bonar as Damilola's Teacher
Shanice Sewell as Passionate Youth

Reception

Critical reception
The Telegraphs Michael Hogan gave the film four stars out of five, calling it a "terrific piece of TV" and a "fitting tribute". Hogan also praised the "superb" performances from Babou Ceesay and Wunmi Mosaku, and noted that Sammy Kamara as Damilola was "luminous and full of life".

The Guardians Sam Wollaston called the film a "quietly powerful, affecting drama" and praised the performances from Mosaku, Juwon Adedokun, and in particular, Ceesay.

Accolades

References

External links
 

2016 films
BBC television dramas
British drama television films
English-language television shows
BAFTA winners (television series)
British films based on actual events
Television shows set in London
2016 television films
Films directed by Euros Lyn